Bonneyville Mills is a historic grist mill located at Bonneyville Mills in York Township, Elkhart County, Indiana. It was built in 1832, and is a -story, square, heavy timber-frame building on a stone foundation.  It measures 40 feet by 40 feet and has several shed additions.  The mill was converted to electric power in 1919 and restored in the 1970s.

It was added to the National Register of Historic Places in 1976.

References

External links

Elkhart County Parks: Bonneyville Mill

History museums in Indiana
Grinding mills in Indiana
Grinding mills on the National Register of Historic Places in Indiana
Industrial buildings completed in 1832
Buildings and structures in Elkhart County, Indiana
National Register of Historic Places in Elkhart County, Indiana
1832 establishments in Indiana